The 1963 Kilkenny Senior Hurling Championship was the 69th staging of the Kilkenny Senior Hurling Championship since its establishment by the Kilkenny County Board.

On 27 October 1963, St. Lachtain's won the championship after a 1-07 to 0-03 defeat of Tullogher in the final. It was their second championship title overall and their first title in two championship seasons. It remains their last championship triumph.

Results

Final

References

Kilkenny Senior Hurling Championship
Kilkenny Senior Hurling Championship